Appin is a coastal district of the Scottish West Highlands bounded to the west by Loch Linnhe, to the south by Loch Creran, to the east by the districts of Benderloch and Lorne, and to the north by Loch Leven. It lies northeast to southwest, and measures . The name, meaning "abbey land", in reference to Ligmore Abbey, is derived from the Middle Irish apdaine.

The district is mainly in Argyll and Bute, with a coastal strip to the north, along Loch Leven, within the Highland council area.

The scenery of the district is a combination of seascapes with rugged and mountainous country inland. Appin forms part of the Lynn of Lorn National Scenic Area, one of 40 in Scotland. The principal hills are double peaks of Beinn a' Bheithir – , respectively –  and Creag Ghorm –  – in the north, and Fraochaidh , Meall Bàn  and Beinn Mhic na Cèisich  near the western flank of Glen Creran. The chief rivers are the Coe and Laroch, flowing into Loch Leven, the Duror and Salachan flowing into Loch Linnhe, and the Iola and Creran flowing into Loch Creran.

The leading industries are forestry and tourism, with lead mining and slate quarrying being of former importance, but the Glensanda superquarry, in Morvern on the opposite bank of Loch Linnhe also provides local employment. Ballachulish, Duror, Portnacroish, Appin Village and Port Appin are the principal villages.

Appin was the country of a branch of the Stewarts.

The A828 road runs along the coast of Appin. A passenger-only ferry to the island of Lismore runs from Port Appin. The district formerly had a railway, but the Caledonian Railway company's branch line from Connel to Ballachulish was closed in 1966.

Appin is where the Appin Murder took place in 1752.

Notable residents
 Elizabeth Macquarie (née Campbell), wife of the fifth governor of New South Wales, was born in the area. During his term the governor named the towns of Appin and Airds after his wife's birthplace and her family's estate respectively. The Female Orphan School in Parramatta is said to have been modelled on the estate's main house.

References

External links
Further information on the history of Appin
Castle Stalker

Geography of Argyll and Bute
Geography of Highland (council area)
Villages in Argyll and Bute